Robert Peterson may refer to:

Politics
Robert Peterson (Canadian politician) (born 1937), former Canadian Liberal senator from Saskatchewan
Robert Peterson (South Dakota politician) (1888–1968), lieutenant governor of South Dakota
Robert W. Peterson (politician) (1929–2013), North Dakota state auditor

Sports
Robert Peterson (footballer) (born 1952), former Australian rules footballer
Buzz Peterson (Robert Bower Peterson Jr., born 1963), American basketball executive, former player and coach

Writing
Robert Peterson (poet) (1924–2000), American poet
Robert Evans Peterson (1812–1894), American publisher and editor
Robert W. Peterson (writer) (1925–2006), American sports writer

Other
Robert Peterson (art director) (1909–1979), American art director
Robert O. Peterson (1916–1994), American businessman, founder of Jack in the Box

See also
Bob Peterson (disambiguation)
Robert Petersen (disambiguation)